Timbuktu is an old crater on Mars, located in the Margaritifer Sinus quadrangle (MC-19) region at 5.7° S and 37.6° W. It measures approximately  in diameter and was named after the city of Timbuktu in Mali, Africa.  It is located on the northwestern edge of Capri Chasma.  The crater has numerous cracks that form an irregular figure similar to the streets found in Timbuktu.

References

See also 
 Climate of Mars
 Geology of Mars
 Impact event
 List of craters on Mars
 Ore resources on Mars
 Planetary nomenclature

Margaritifer Sinus quadrangle
Impact craters on Mars